Ladies and Gentlemen is the third studio album by American-Australian singer Marcia Hines. Ladies and Gentlemen peaked at No. 6 in Australia and produced two top ten singles, including "You", which peaked at No. 2 and remains Hines' highest-charting single.

Track listing

Personnel
Produced, arranged and conducted by Robie Porter
Cover art by Barry Falkner 
Cover photography – Patrick Jones
Backing vocal by Lorna Wright and Terry Young 
Arranged by Col Loughnan (tracks: A2, A5, B2, B4, B5), Peter Jones (tracks: A1), Rick Formosa (tracks: A3, B1, B3), Tony Ansell (tracks: A1, B1, B3)

Charts

Weekly charts

Year-end charts

References

External links

1977 albums
Marcia Hines albums